Saldus Parish is an administrative unit of Saldus Municipality, Latvia.

Towns, villages and settlements of Saldus Parish

References 

Parishes of Latvia
Saldus Municipality
Courland